Synodontis matthesi is a species of upside-down catfish endemic to Tanzania where it occurs in the Rufiji River basin.  This species grows to a length of  TL.

References

External links 

matthesi
Freshwater fish of Africa
Fish of Tanzania
Endemic fauna of Tanzania
Fish described in 1971
Taxa named by Max Poll
Taxonomy articles created by Polbot